Escamp is a district of The Hague, Netherlands, built largely after the Second World War, on the 15th century Eskamppolders. With the addition of the Vinex neighbourhood Wateringse Veld, Escamp is the most populous district of the city; as of January 2013, it had 118,483 inhabitants. The district features one railway station: Den Haag Moerwijk.

Escamp consists of the following neighbourhoods:
 Bouwlust & Vrederust
 Leyenburg
 Moerwijk & Zuiderpark
 Morgenstond
 Rustenburg & Oostbroek
 Wateringse Veld

References 

Boroughs of The Hague